Cocote is a 2017 Dominican Republic drama film directed by Nelson Carlo de Los Santos Arias. It was selected as the Dominican entry for the Best Foreign Language Film at the 91st Academy Awards, but it was not nominated.

Cast
 Vicente Santos as Alberto
 Judith Rodíguez as Karina
 Pepe Sierra as Martínez
 Yuberbi Rosa as Patria
 Isabel Spencer as Chave

See also
 List of submissions to the 91st Academy Awards for Best Foreign Language Film
 List of Dominican submissions for the Academy Award for Best Foreign Language Film

References

External links
 

2017 films
2017 drama films
Dominican Republic drama films
2010s Spanish-language films